Woodstock is the eighth studio album by American rock band Portugal. The Man, released on June 16, 2017 through Atlantic Records.

Background and recording
After having released Evil Friends in 2013, Portugal. The Man began work on a new project, under the working title Gloomin + Doomin. This album was eventually shelved, partly due to a conversation between John Gourley and his father and the discovery of a lost ticket stub from the Woodstock festival. Work began on the Woodstock album shortly thereafter, involving new music as well as material from the Gloomin + Doomin era. In 2014, the band often uploaded to their Instagram account while working on the album.

Promotion
On December 1, 2016, the band released a single and accompanying music video for the track "Noise Pollution". The music video was directed by Michael Ragen, and shot on location in Alaska. The label did not release nor promote this song to radio.

"Feel It Still" was released as the lead single from the album on March 3, 2017. It reached number four on the Billboard Hot 100, becoming their first entry on the chart.
The song peaked at number one on the Billboard Adult Alternative Songs chart, becoming the band's first chart-topper; as well as number one on the Alternative Songs chart, and is their first top ten on either chart.

On April 28, 2017, "Number One" was released as a pre release buzz track from Woodstock, along with an official announcement and pre-orders for the album.

"Live in the Moment" was announced to be the follow up radio single to "Feel It Still" by Atlantic Records GM David Saslow in an interview with Sirius XM. It was sent to triple-A radio October 30, 2017, and later to alternative radio in November. The song peaked at number one on the Billboard Adult Alternative Songs chart and the Alternative Songs chart. It is their second Alternative Songs number one hit. The song was also released as part of the soundtrack of FIFA 18, the video game by EA Sports.

Track listing

Notes
  signifies an additional producer.

Personnel

Portugal. The Man
 John Gourley – guitar, vocals
 Zachary Carothers – bass guitar, backing vocals
 Kyle O'Quin – guitar, keyboards, backing vocals, synthesizer
 Eric Howk – guitar
 Jason Sechrist – drums
 Zoe Manville - backing vocals

Additional musicians
 Richie Havens – featured musician
 Son Little – featured musician
 ASAP Rocky – additional vocals 
 Fat Lip – featured musician
 Mary Elizabeth Winstead – featured musician
 Dave Palmer – keyboards 
 Kane Ritchotte – drums 

Technical

 John Hill – production
 Brian Burton – production
 Mike D – production
 Ammar Malik – production
 Asa Taccone – production
 Ajay Bhattacharyya – production
 Nick Koenig – production
 Casey Bates – engineering
 Jeff Jackson – engineering
 Robin Florent – engineering
 Rob Cohen – engineering
 Manny Marroquin – mixing
 Chris Galland – mixing
 Michelle Mancini – mastering
 Josh Welch – photography

Charts

Weekly charts

Year-end charts

Certifications

References

Portugal. The Man albums
2017 albums
Atlantic Records albums
Albums produced by Mike D
Albums produced by Danger Mouse (musician)
Albums produced by John Hill (record producer)
Albums produced by Hot Sugar (musician)
Albums produced by Ammar Malik
Albums produced by Stint (producer)
Albums produced by Asa Taccone
Albums recorded at Kingsize Soundlabs